The 1995 Trophée des Champions was a football match held at Stade Francis-Le Blé, Brest on 3 January 1996, that saw 1995 Coupe de France winners Paris Saint-Germain F.C. defeat 1994–95 Division 1 champions FC Nantes 6–5 on penalty kicks after a draw of 2–2.

Match details

See also
1995–96 French Division 1

1995–96 in French football
1995
Paris Saint-Germain F.C. matches
FC Nantes matches
Association football penalty shoot-outs
January 1996 sports events in Europe
Sport in Brest, France